Cenk Enes Özer is a Turkish novelist.

Early life and education
Cenk Enes Özer was born in December 1978. He lives in Ankara. In 1996, he went to Eskişehir to do his bachelor's degree in Anadolu Üniversitesi. Then, he returned to Ankara after he graduated from the Department of Finance in 2000.

Career
After graduation, Özer completed his military duty and worked in different job positions until 2007 when he started his work as an author. 
He published his first book "Hizmetkar kim?" in 2007 and it was the first book in a series of seven books called "Hizmetkar Serisi". Starting from 2007, Cenk Enes Özer issues a new book a year to be totally up today 9 books which have gotten interests of a large number of readers in Turkey particularly from youth. "Hizmetkar Serisi" includes "Hizmetkar Kim?", "Kara Kutu Operasyonu", "Pindaros'un Kitabı", "Kılıcın Bekçileri", "Şeytan Severse", "Sinova" and "Adalia". Özer ended up his first series of novels "Hizmetkar Serisi" by the last book "Adalia" in 2013. In the beginning of 2014, "Süleyman: Piyonun Yolu" book was published for him and the fiction level of this book has fascinated lots of readers. Recently, another book was published for the author as a complementary novel for "Süleyman: Piyonun Yolu" which is named "Süleyman II: Oyunun Sonu". 
Özer pays a lot of his attention to his books readers; as well, he shares in activities at schools and other institutes in Turkey to spread his ideas to help and encourage the youth toward developing their creativities under saying "Why not? Don't start saying it's impossible, but asking how it can be possible." Cenk enes özer was invited to a TEDx Talk by Kılıçaslan High School in Kayseri, Turkey; and on the twelfth of April 2014 he shared in that event with a motivating talk about a unique explanation of the faith sense in title: "İnancın Eşsiz Anlatımı." 
Özer is busy with preparations for his new books, signing days and meeting people who are interested in his ideas. At the same time, he participates in a lot of activities to help the youth motivationally in different occasions.

Bibliography
 In Turkish
 Hizmetkar Kim?, published: 2007, last version: October 2012, 192 pages, 
 Kara Kutu Operasyonu, published: 2008, last version: November 2012, 168 pages, 
 Pindaros’un Kitabı, published: 2009, last version: February 2012, 183 pages, 
 Kılıcın Bekçiler, published: 2010, last version: April 2012, 192 pages, 
 Şeytan Severse, published: 2011, last version: January 2012, 213 pages, 
 Sinova, published: 2012, last version: September 2012, 210 pages, 
 Adalia, published: 2013, last version: March 2013, 245 pages, 
 SÜLEY-MAN I: Piyonun Yolu, published: 2014, last version: March 2014, 242 pages, 
 SÜLEY-MAN II: Oyunun Sonu, published: 2015, last version: March 2015, 242 pages, 
 Zamansız Yağmur Başlıyor, published: 2017 February 13, 280 pages,  
 In English
 The Servant, (The translation of Hizmetkar Kim?) published: 2015, last version: August 2015, 220 pages,

References

External links

Cenk Enes Özer's Official Website
Cenk Enes Özer on Facebook
Cenk Enes Özer on Twitter
Cenk Enes Özer on Instagram
Cenk Enes Özer on goodreads
TEDx Talk: İnancın Eşsiz Anlatımı (A Unique Explaining of the Faith): Cenk Enes Özer

Turkish writers
1978 births
Living people
Place of birth missing (living people)
People from Ankara
Anadolu University alumni